The La Sella Open is a professional golf tournament on the Ladies European Tour, first played in 2023. 

The tournament, held at La Sella Golf near Alicante in Spain the week before The Evian Championship, is one of 12 LET events in 2023 to feature a prize fund of at least $1 million.

Winners

References

External links
Ladies European Tour
La Sella Golf 

La Sella Open
Golf tournaments in Spain